The 2012 Danish Figure Skating Championships was held in Hvidovre from December 1 through 4, 2011. Skaters competed in the disciplines of men's singles, ladies' singles, pairs skating, and ice dancing on the levels of senior, junior, novice, and the pre-novice levels of debs, springs, and cubs. The results were used to choose the teams to the 2012 World Championships, the 2012 European Championships, the 2012 Nordic Championships, and the 2012 World Junior Championships.

Results

Men

Ladies

External links
 2012 Danish Championships results
 DM 2012
 Dansk Skøjte Union

Danish Figure Skating Championships
2011 in figure skating
Danish Figure Skating Championships, 2012
Figure Skating Championships